Sutton Farm is a historic farm property at 4592 Dorset Road in Shelburne, Vermont.  Established in 1788, the farm was operated continuously into the late 20th century by a single family, and includes a well-preserved Greek Revival farmhouse.  It was listed on the National Register of Historic Places in 2004.

Description and history 
The main farm complex is set on both sides of Dorset Road, south of Sutton Farm Lane, a residential development built on land historically associated with the farm. Including that development, the farm property is roughly rectangular, with acreage on the west side of the road cultivated, and that on the east side divided between crops, pasture, and hay. Stone walls line some of the boundaries between usages. The farmstead consists of a brick Cape style farmhouse, set on the west side of the road; it was built about 1815 as a plank-framed wood frame structure, and was finished in brick about 1830, at which time its Greek Revival features were also added. Adjacent to the house are a garage of and chicken house, both built in the 1930s, while a long barn and silos, all from the mid-20th century, stand on the east side of the road.

The farm property was acquired in 1788 by Benjamin Sutton, a native of Greenwich, Connecticut.  He and his family lived at first in log cabins (built in two separate locations on the property), before this house was built in the mid-1810s.  The house is notable for its unusually high kneewall in the upper story, a feature found only in a few surviving homes in northeastern Shelburne, and thus probably the work of a particular local builder.  The house was finished in brick, probably when Sutton's son Bryon took over the farm in the 1830s.  Sutton descendants continued to farm the property themselves until about 1985, at which time farmers of the adjacent land to the south took over operations.

See also 
National Register of Historic Places listings in Chittenden County, Vermont

References 

Historic districts on the National Register of Historic Places in Vermont
Farms on the National Register of Historic Places in Vermont
National Register of Historic Places in Chittenden County, Vermont
Greek Revival architecture in Vermont
Commercial buildings completed in 1792
Buildings and structures in Shelburne, Vermont